The  of the Japan Ground Self-Defense Force (JGSDF) are military training courses oriented toward Commando operations.

History 
The original course that is still held at Fuji School was established in 1956 by two JGSDF officers who had graduated from the United States Army Ranger School. This course was basically the Japanese version of the American Ranger School at the beginning.

In 1960, local ranger courses were started by each infantry regiment. As ranger courses continued to be carried out in various JGSDF units, they developed according to the country's geography.

Ranger Courses 

Generally, there are four types of Ranger Courses as follows, but all courses are known for their severe harshness so only eligible soldiers can take these courses:
 Local courses
 Enlisted ranks can take Ranger courses with their divisions, brigades and regiments. These courses are conducted by instructors who have completed the Fuji School course, but are localized according to the area in charge of each unit. For example, there is the Japanese Alps in the area of responsibility for the 13th Infantry Regiment (Matsumoto, Nagano), so its Ranger Courses focus on mountain warfare and are known as the "Alpen Ranger".
 After heavy physical training, nine exercises are held in the ordinary local course for nine weeks while enduring great mental and psychological stresses and physical fatigue, and the following skills are acquired:
 Navigation
 Demolition
 Military communications
 Waterborne infiltration
 Air assault
 Survival skills
 Mountaineering skills
 Special reconnaissance
 At Fuji School (at the base of Mount Fuji)
 Course instructor candidates and officers need to complete the 13-week course at the Fuji School. Those who complete this course are specifically qualified to wear a gold badge.
 At Narashino (Chiba Prefecture)
 The 1st Airborne Brigade aims to give ranger training to all the members and implements its own Airborne Ranger Courses.
 At Niseko (Hokkaido)
This is advanced post-graduate ranger training for cold-weather warfare, thus soldiers who have completed this course are entitled to wear special badges, in addition to regular ranger badges.

JGSDF soldiers are not the only to participate in the courses. Air Self Defense Force paramedics (Japanese counterpart of the United States Air Force Pararescuemen) also have participated in Airborne Ranger Courses. JGSDF rangers are known as the pioneers of the rope and mountain rescue techniques, thus eligible members of the civilian law enforcement and rescue organization (Mountain security squads of the Police and Rescue Technicians of the Fire departments, for example) can take Ranger Courses arranged for search and rescue operations.

Deployment 
Unlike the United States Army Rangers, the JGSDF has adopted a policy to improve the level of the whole forces by distributing rangers to each units, thus the unit consisting only of rangers was not established except for the training units in the Fuji School and CWCT. But in case of special operations or disaster response, commanding officers may gather Rangers and organize Ranger units temporarily.

When Western Army Infantry Regiment (WAiR; later expanded to Amphibious Rapid Deployment Brigade) was launched in 2002, Ranger platoons were set up in this regiment. These platoons are certified as special operation units. In 2012, they conducted joint landing exercises with the United States Marine Corps in Guam.

Notes

References

Books

External links

 , Official Channel of the GSDF
 , Defence Graphics Channel

Military education and training in Japan
Special forces of Japan
Japan Ground Self-Defense Force